Hymenopappus tenuifolius, the Chalk Hill hymenopappus, is a North American species of flowering plant in the daisy family. It grows in the central and southeastern United States, primarily on the Great Plains from Texas and New Mexico north as far as South Dakota.

Hymenopappus tenuifolius is a biennial herb up to 150 cm (5 feet) tall. It produces 20-200 flower heads per stem, each head with 25–50 white disc flowers but no ray flowers.

References

External links
Photo of herbarium specimen at Missouri Botanical Garden, collected in 1839 somewhere on the Great Plains
Eastern Colorado Wildflowers
Lady Bird Johnson Wildflower Center, University of Texas

tenuifolius
Endemic flora of the United States
Flora of the Great Plains (North America)
Flora of the United States
Plants described in 1788
Taxa named by Frederick Traugott Pursh
Flora without expected TNC conservation status